Andrew Joseph Lewis (born November 11, 1989) is an American politician and attorney serving as a member of the Seattle City Council representing District 7. He was an assistant city attorney prior to his election and also worked on political campaigns.

Early life and education

Lewis was raised in Seattle's Ballard neighborhood to a family of local political organizers; his father worked for Seattle City Light and his mother was a nurse at Harborview Medical Center. His activities in politics began in high school by attending marches and volunteering for political campaigns, including stints on the Seattle Youth Council and the board of the Washington State Young Democrats.

Lewis attended the University of Washington, where he earned a Bachelor of Arts in history and political science, was named a Harry S. Truman Scholar, and interned with the Seattle City Council. Lewis was the government relations director for the Associated Students of the University of Washington from 2011-2012. He was the campaign director for Nick Licata in his successful 2009 reelection campaign. Lewis earned a Master of Arts degree from the London School of Economics and Juris Doctor from the UC Berkeley School of Law. He also served as a teaching assistant for former Labor Secretary Robert Reich, who later endorsed him.

Career

Upon his return to Seattle, Lewis was appointed to serve on the Seattle Human Rights Commission and the Rental Housing Inspection Stakeholder Committee. He also worked as a deputy prosecutor for the King County Juvenile Division until he left to work as an assistant city attorney for Seattle.

Lewis announced his campaign for the District 7 council seat in November 2018, shortly after incumbent Sally Bagshaw announced she would not run. He campaigned on expanding housing affordability in the city and received support from progressive groups and local labor unions. Lewis finished first among the field in the primary election, with 32 percent of the vote, and advanced to the general election alongside former Seattle Police Department chief Jim Pugel. His campaign received financial support from a local hotel workers union's political action committee, while Pugel received support from Amazon and the Seattle Metropolitan Chamber of Commerce.

Lewis won in the general election with 53 percent of the vote after initial returns showed him narrowly trailing Pugel. He became the youngest city councilmember in Seattle history, entering office at the age of 29. Lewis was sworn in on December 31, 2019, at the community P-Patch atop the Mercer Garage at the Seattle Center, which he announced would not close. He took office in January 2020 and was named to a regional homelessness governing board alongside at-large councilmember Lorena González.

A political progressive, Lewis has been characterized as more moderate than his city council colleagues. Lewis has referred to himself as a "labor Democrat", and did not support Seattle head tax ordinance. He was the president of the Seattle Parks Board; in 2020, Lewis voted to reduce funding to the Seattle Police Department, but later changed his stance to support funding with alternative resources. Lewis announced his intent to run for re-election in 2023.

Personal life

Lewis is a resident of the Lower Queen Anne neighborhood in Seattle. In an interview with The Seattle Times, he described himself as "not a Socialist" and identified as a labor Democrat.

Electoral history

2019 election

References

Living people
Lawyers from Seattle
Politicians from Seattle
Seattle City Council members
Alumni of the London School of Economics
University of California, Berkeley alumni
University of Washington alumni
21st-century American politicians
1989 births